Rosental Calmon Alves (born 1952) is a Brazilian journalist.

Alves began his journalism career at the age of sixteen. He studied journalism at the Federal University of Rio de Janeiro. Aged 21, he began lecturing and teaching journalism in Brazil at Fluminense Federal University and at Gama Filho University. Alves wrote for Jornal do Brasil as a foreign correspondent, and managing editor, and helped the publication launch its website in 1994. In 1996, Alves moved to the United States to join the faculty of the University of Texas at Austin as the inaugural Knight Chair in International Journalism. Alves researched the development of journalism education in Latin America.

References

1952 births
Living people
20th-century journalists
21st-century journalists
Brazilian expatriate academics in the United States
Brazilian editors
Newspaper editors
Federal University of Rio de Janeiro alumni
University of Texas at Austin faculty
20th-century Brazilian male writers
21st-century Brazilian male writers
Writers from Rio de Janeiro (city)
Brazilian journalists
Journalism academics
Male journalists